Ikot Akpanya is a village in Etinan local government area of Akwa Ibom State.

References 

Villages in Akwa Ibom